Lifehouse is the third studio album by pop rock band Lifehouse. It was released in 2005 on Geffen Records.

It debuted at #10 on the Billboard 200, selling 63,000 copies in its first week of release and was certified Gold by the RIAA on September 7, 2005. Lifehouse has sold 960,000 units in the US as of November 2009,  and over three million worldwide to date.

Background 
The album saw a shift in Lifehouse's sound. It notably featured less of the angst-ridden post-grunge sound of their previous two albums, and marked their first album to adopt the lighter, more radio-friendly adult pop rock sound prevalent in their subsequent albums. Tracks such as "We'll Never Know" feature more post-grunge flair, while the albums two lead singles "You and Me" and "Blind" lean towards pop rock.

Track listing

Personnel
Lifehouse
Jason Wade – acoustic guitar, electric guitar, lead vocals, string arrangements
Rick Woolstenhulme, Jr. – percussion, piano, drums
Bryce Soderberg – bass guitar, background vocals
John Alagía – bass guitar, piano, electric guitar, Hammond organ, ukulele, background vocals, vibraphone, Chamberlin
Oliver Kraus – cello, string arrangements
Production
John Alagía – producer, mixing
Danny Clinch – photography
Jude Cole – producer , executive producer
Pete Hanlon – assistant engineer
Ted Jensen – mastering
Jeff Juliano – engineer, mixing
Nathaniel Kunkel – string engineer

Charts

Weekly charts

Year-end charts

Certifications

References

Lifehouse (band) albums
2005 albums
Geffen Records albums
Albums produced by John Alagía
Interscope Geffen A&M Records albums